Darwinia foetida, commonly known as Muchea bell, is a plant in the myrtle family Myrtaceae, and is endemic to Western Australia. It is a small upright shrub with greenish coloured nodding flowers at the apex of the stems, that have an unpleasant odour (hence the Latin specific epithet foetida, "smelly"). This is a very restricted species, known from only a couple of locations.

Description
The young branches are green-brown and slender, with prominent decurrent leaf bases that become grey and woody. The green leaves are smooth, narrow and triangular in cross-section. The inflorescence consists of 12-15 flowers usually nodding at the end of the stem. The flower bracts are in rows, leaf-like and wider at the base.

Taxonomy and naming
Darwinia foetida was first formally described in 2010 by Gregory John Keighery and published in the Australian Plant Census. The specific epithet (foetida) refers to the distinctive foetid smell of the flowers.

Distribution and habitat
It grows on sandy grey-black mounds where there are seasonally moist winters  to wet clay situations in either tall or low scrubland and areas where water collects.

Conservation status
Darwinia foetida is classified as "critically endangered" under the Australian Government Environment Protection and Biodiversity Conservation Act 1999 and as "endangered" under the Biodiversity Conservation Act 2016 in Western Australia. The species has a restricted area of distribution in the Muchea area. The present main threat is grazing by rabbits, also weed invasion, inappropriate fire regimes and disease caused by Phytophthora cinnamomi.

References

 

foetida
Endemic flora of Western Australia
Critically endangered flora of Australia
Rosids of Western Australia
Myrtales of Australia
Plants described in 2009
Taxa named by Gregory John Keighery